Fernando Guillén is the name of:

 Fernando Guillén (fencer) (1895–1925), Spanish fencer
 Fernando Guillén (actor) (1932–2013), Spanish actor
 Fernando Guillén Cuervo (born 1963), Spanish actor, son of above

See also 
 Guillén